Tijara Jain Temple is a digambar Jain temple dedicated to Chandraprabha. The temple is located in the hill town Tijara, in the Alwar district of Rajasthan, India. It is an Atishaya Kshetra (English: Place where Miracles happen). The location is a tirtha (pilgrimage site) for the Jains and a tourist attraction.

History 
The temple was established in 1956 following the recovery of an idol of Chandraprabha on 16 August 1956. In 1972, another  idol chandraprabhu in the lotus position was discovered. The white stone idol was retrieved from underground, reinforcing the belief that this place was once a Dehra, a place where Jain idols are worshipped. After the setting up of the Jain temple, the place has regained its former importance as a pilgrimage centre.

Main temple and idol
The mulnayak of the temple is a  white marble idol of Chandraprabhu, the eighth tirthankara, in lotus position. According to the inscription, the idol was installed on the 3rd day of Vaishakha Shukla in 1497(V.S. 1554). Both the idols, with others, are installed in a rectangular temple decorated with pinnacles. The temple walls have elaborate carvings, paintings and intricate glasswork depicting various scenes of tirthankar's life and event in Jain legends. The temple is considered an important Jain center.

There is a township in the name of Lord Chandraprabha as "Chandralok City" spread in more than 100 acre, on main road.

There is a 250 years old, Parshavanatha temple situated near the main temple. Navagraha Jain Temple and Padmavati temple are also near temple complex.

Gallery

Main temple

Chandragiri Vatika

Other Temples

See also

Shri Mahavirji
Pinangwan
Jainism in Rajasthan

References

Citations

Sources

External links
Alwar District official website

Tourist attractions in Alwar district
Jain temples in Rajasthan
20th-century Jain temples